Karen Stollznow (born 12 August 1976) is an Australian-American writer, linguist, and skeptic.  Her books include  The Language of Discrimination, God Bless America: Strange and Unusual Religious Beliefs and Practices in the United States,  Haunting America, Language Myths, Mysteries and Magic, Hits and Mrs, and Would You Believe It?: Mysterious Tales From People You'd Least Expect. She also writes short stories, and is a host on the podcast Monster Talk.

Career
A student of linguistics and history at the University of New England in Armidale, New South Wales, she received First Class Honors in Linguistics, and went on to a PhD in the area of Lexical Semantics. She graduated with her doctorate in 2007. In 2004, she relocated to California to become a Visiting Student Researcher with the Department of Linguistics at the University of California, Berkeley. In 2005, she became a Researcher for the Script Encoding Initiative, a joint project between the UC Berkeley Department of Linguistics, and the Unicode Consortium.

From 1997 to 2009, Stollznow was a prominent investigator and writer for the Australian Skeptics and served as Editor of their magazine The Skeptic for which she also wrote many articles. She has also written for publications such as Australasian Science, Neucleus, Skeptical Inquirer, and others.

Between 2009 and 2011 she wrote the Naked Skeptic column for the Committee for Skeptical Inquiry (CSI), now rebranded as The Good Word for Skeptical Inquirer. In 2010 she began as the Bad Language columnist for Skeptic. She has been a host of the Skeptics Society's MonsterTalk podcast since its beginning in 2009 and in 2010 she became a host of the Center for Inquiry's Point of Inquiry podcast as well. In 2011 she presented a talk at the Colorado Springs SkeptiCamp on Making (Up) History, and at the Denver/Boulder SkeptiCamp on Braco the Gazer. In 2012 she was a speaker at The Amazing Meeting in Las Vegas, giving a talk titled "Prediction and Language", and in 2013 giving a talk titled "What an Excellent Day for an Exorcism".

Stollznow is also a Research Fellow for the James Randi Educational Foundation. She is a Contributing Editor for Skeptical Inquirer magazine, a Fellow of the Committee for Skeptical Inquiry.

Selected publications

 Stollznow, Karen (2017).  The Language of Discrimination. Lincom GmbH. 
 Stollznow, Karen (2017).  Would You Believe It?: Mysterious Tales From People You'd Least Expect. Amazon Digital Services. 
 Stollznow, Karen (2016).  Hits and Mrs. Amazon Digital Services. 
 Stollznow, Karen (2014).  Language Myths, Mysteries and Magic.  
 Stollznow, Karen (2013).  God Bless America: Strange and Unusual Religious Beliefs and Practices in the United States.  
 Stollznow, Karen (2013). Haunting America. James Randi Educational Foundation. .
 Stollznow, Karen (2010). Skepticism and the Paranormal: A Rose By Any Other Name. In Bonett, W. (Ed.) The Australian Book of Atheism. Scribe Publications

Personal life
Stollznow is an expatriate Australian and formerly lived in the San Francisco Bay Area, California. Born in the Sydney suburb of Manly, she grew up in Collaroy, on the Northern Beaches of Sydney.

Stollznow lives with her husband and their son in Denver, Colorado.

References

External links

 
 
 MonsterTALK – cryptozoology podcast she co-hosts
 The Good Word – past Skeptical Inquirer column

1976 births
Living people
Linguists from Australia
Women linguists
Australian science writers
Australian sceptics
Australian women bloggers
Australian women podcasters
Australian podcasters
People from New South Wales